Chambers and Partners (often noted elsewhere as Chambers & Partners) produces international rankings for the legal industry, which is headquartered in London, United Kingdom.

Orbach and Chambers
Orbach and Chambers Publishing Limited was founded 19 December 1969, in London, by friends Laurence Francis Orbach, a university professor, and lawyer Michael Ernest David Chambers.

Chambers and Partners
Chambers and Partners was founded in 1989 as a division of Orbach & Chambers Publishing Limited (later, Orbach & Chambers Holdings Limited), book publishers. by Laurence Francis Orbach, who, in 1976, also co-founded The Quarto Group. and attorney Michael Ernest David Chambers.

During the 21st century, the firm became widely recognized as an authority on global legal rankings, and was referenced, in 2018, by The National Law Review as "one of the legal industry’s most prestigious rankings — and also the most notoriously difficult to crack."

In March 2018, Michael Chambers sold the company to Village Ventures' investment fund, Inflexion Private Equity, with former managing director Mark Wyatt re-joining Chambers and Partners as CEO. The sale was represented by Slaughter and May.

In 2020, the company was criticized, alongside its competitor The Legal 500, for taking advantage of the U.K. government furlough scheme to help alleviate economic hardship resulting from the COVID-19 pandemic in the United Kingdom, despite strong sales, while claiming a reduction in income which did not appear supported in practice.

Operations

The company employs over 200 editors in London who conduct research and interviews in more than 20 languages, and provides ranking on over 80,000 lawyers in more than 185 jurisdictions.

The Times of London reported the company's revenues as £20 million for 2018.

In June 2019, The Wall Street Journal reported that Chambers and Partners most recent annual guide to lawyers based solely in the U.S. totaled 3,239 pages.

Chambers Guides
Aside from its ranking activities; since 1990, the company has published "Chambers Global Practice Guides", for law practice areas in a range of global jurisdictions. Chambers Guides, and its sections, are authored and edited by vetted legal professionals from firms such as DLA Piper, Eversheds Sutherland, Baker McKenzie, Cravath, Swaine and Moore, and Morgan, Lewis & Bockius.

Chambers and Partners publishes its law school guide, "Chambers Student" online.

See also
 The Legal 500

References

External links
 

Books by publishing company of the United Kingdom
International law literature
International rankings